The Miller Climbers were a minor league baseball team based in Miller, South Dakota. In 1920, Miller played as charter members of the Class D level South Dakota League, finishing in last place while hosting home minor league games at Crystal Park.

History
In 1920, Miller, South Dakota first hosted minor league baseball when the "Miller Climbers" began play as charter members of the eight–team, Class D level South Dakota League. The Aberdeen Boosters, Huron Packers, Madison Greys, Mitchell Kernels, Redfield Reds, Sioux Falls Soos and Wessington Springs Saints teams joined Miller in beginning play charter members of the South Dakota League. The Miller team was also referred to as the "Jugglers" in 1920.

The Miller Climbers finished in 8th place in the South Dakota League as the league folded during the season. Miller ended the 1920 season with a record of 30–64, playing under managers Showboat Fisher and Frank Gurney. The South Dakota league disbanded on July 17, 1920. Miller finished 29.0 games behind the Mitchell Kernels in the final standings and were 10.0 games behind the 7th place Aberdeen Boosters. After the South Dakota league disbanded on July 17, the league changed names to the Dakota League and resumed play during the season, but Miller did not field a franchise.

The Miller franchise permanently folded after the 1920 season. Miller has not hosted another minor league team.

The ballpark
The Miller Climbers hosted home minor league games at Crystal Park. The 20-acre park is still in use today as a public park. Crystal Park is located at West 7th Street & West 2nd Avenue, Miller, South Dakota.

Year-by-year records

Notable alumni
Showboat Fisher (1920, player/MGR)

References

External links
Baseball Reference

Professional baseball teams in South Dakota
Defunct baseball teams in South Dakota
Baseball teams established in 1920
Baseball teams disestablished in 1920
South Dakota League teams
Hand County, South Dakota
1920 establishments in South Dakota
1920 disestablishments in South Dakota